The Hamilton County Justice Center is the main county jail branch for Hamilton County, Ohio. It is serviced by the Hamilton County Sheriff's Office. The facility is located at 1000 Sycamore Street in the central business district of Cincinnati. 

The Hamilton County Justice Center was built in 1985 at an expense of $54 million. The complex consists of two brutalist-style twin towers, each of which rise ten floors. The jail twin towers are connected to each other by a windowless skywalk. Direct access to the jail from the Hamilton County Courthouse (across the street) is afforded by another skywalk passing over Sycamore Street.

The jail holds an average 1424 prisoners daily, and an estimated 55,000 annually, giving it the dubious distinction of being one of the 25 largest jails in the U.S.

Several artifacts taken from the Cincinnati Work House and Hospital, a former 19th-century jail, are on display at the Hamilton County Justice Center.

On May 31, 2020, the Hamilton County Sheriff's Department in Cincinnati, Ohio, had an American Flag removed from the justice center and replaced it with a "thin blue line" flag in response to the protests to the murder of George Floyd.  It was later reported that the American flag was first stolen, despite images to the contrary. The blue line flag was taken down.

References

Twin towers
Government buildings completed in 1985
Brutalist architecture in Ohio
County government buildings in Ohio
Jails in Ohio